Oliver Barrett Clason (September 28, 1850-?) was an American lawyer and politician from Maine.

Clason grew up in Gardiner, Maine and graduated from Bates College in 1877. He taught for several years and then studied law and passed the bar in October 1881. He later partnered with future Chief Justice of the Maine Supreme Judicial Court, fellow Senate President, and Bates alumnus Albert Spear.

He served in the Maine House of Representatives from 1889 to 1892, as mayor of Gardiner from 1894 to 1896, and in the Maine Senate in 1897 and 1899. During his second term, he was elected President of the Maine Senate.

References

1850 births
Year of death missing
People from Gardiner, Maine
Mayors of places in Maine
Bates College alumni
Maine lawyers
Members of the Maine House of Representatives
Presidents of the Maine Senate
19th-century American politicians

de:Oliver B. Clason